Introduced in the 2016 Season, as a reserve side for the Brisbane Women's Premier League, BWPL, it operates as a part of the first tier of women's senior Football (Association Football) in Brisbane, Queensland and third overall in Australia.

Current clubs 
The teams for 2016 Season are shown in the table below.

References

2016 Brisbane Women's Premier League Reserves Ladder

Women's soccer leagues in Australia